Cordillera is a department in Paraguay. The capital is the city of Caacupé.

History 

During the seventeenth and eighteenth centuries this area of the country was going through a serious crisis due to population bellicosity of the Indians from Chaco. The villagers from Tobatí located north of the river Pirapo then called, had to migrate south for the continue attacks by Mbaye-guaicurúes. The residents of Altos and Atyrá created their current settlements in the territory of this department.

There were also some settler farmers who were scattered in existing territories Arroyos y Esteros, 1 de Marzo, Caraguatay and Piribebuy.

Towards the end of the eighteenth century these small towns were expanding, consolidating the villages located north of the department as Arroyos y Esteros Eusebio Ayala (then called town of San Roque).

Once the Paraguayan War, began a process of founding of major towns and settlements driven by German immigrants during the government of Bernardino Caballero. Thus, in 1881 saw the founding of San Bernardino, a major tourist resort of Paraguay today

Already in the early twentieth century, in 1906, was organized legally the country dividing the territory into departments. Thus was created the department of Caraguatay, initial name of the department of Cordillera.

In the year 1945, by a decree Law No. 9484, the department received its present name: Cordillera. Finally in 1973, by Law No. 426 took place in a new territorial reorganization and country, at which consolidates the structure of the department with its current boundaries and districts.

Location 

Cordillera Region is located between parallels 24° 50′ and 25° 35′ south latitude and the meridian 56° 30′ and 57° 27′ west.

Limits 

 To the north is bordered by San Pedro Department
 To the south with Paraguarí Department 
 To the southwest is bordered by Central Department
 To the east is bordered by Caaguazú Department
 To the northwest it is divided by Paraguay River from Presidente Hayes Department, located in the western region of the country.

Districts 

The department is divided in 20 districts:

 Altos
 Arroyos y Esteros
 Atyrá
 Caacupé
 Caraguatay
 Emboscada
 Eusebio Ayala
 Isla Pucú
 Itacurubí de la Cordillera
 Juan de Mena
 Loma Grande
 Mbocayaty del Yhaguy
 Nueva Colombia
 Piribebuy
 1° de Marzo
 San Bernardino
 San José Obrero
 Santa Elena
 Tobatí
 Valenzuela

Capital 

Its capital is the city of Caacupé.

The capital was founded on April 4, 1770, by Carlos Murphy. Its area is 150 km2 with a population of 35,324 inhabitants. It is 54 km distant from Asunción and is considered the "spiritual capital" of Paraguay, where La Virgen de los Milagros of Caacupé is venerated at the Basilica (the special place for the Holy Mother), where people walk on pilgrimage every year more than 1.5 million faithful, 7 and December 8.

It is in the top of the Cordillera de Los Altos, obligatory stop for tourists.

Demography 

This department is divided into two distinct areas by presenting physical appearance. An area located to the northeast, where the terrain is presented rather flat with many estuaries suitable for the farm. The other, extended along the Cordillera de Los Altos, with flat surfaces and corrugated satisfactory for agriculture.

Orography 

The districts of Paraguarí, Altos and Emboscada are crisscrossed by the Cordillera de Los Altos, whose height reaches 200 metres. This ridge also crosses the districts of Piribebuy and Eusebio Ayala.

Its elevations are the most attractive hills Caacupé and Tobatí.

Hydrography 

The Paraguay River runs 33 km of this department. Many areas water tributaries, such as Manduvirá River, which crosses the peoples of Piribebuy and Valenzuela. The main tributary of the river Manduvirá is Tobatiry, called in its nascent: Yhaguy River.

Other major rivers are the Piribebuy, which rises in Pirayú and empties into the Paraguay River, and Salado born in Ypacaraí. These waters flowing through a rich vegetation and is forming along the way as the waterfalls of Piribebuy, Piraretá, Chololó and others.

In this department is the emblematic Lake Ypacaraí, which is formed by the waters of many streams that flow into it.

Climate 

It is mild and dry. The average annual temperature is 22 °C. The maximum is reached 39 °C and the minimum drops to 3 °C. Rainfall totaling 1536 mm annually, with an average of 153 mm monthly, except June and August, that only reaches 80 mm.

Ways and media 

The main route is called the Second Marshal José Félix Estigarribia that crosses northern department. It emerged branches and paved enripiados (road that consists of sand and small rocks). Route III “General Elizardo Aquino” crosses the department and joins it with department Concepción. The Paraguay River is navigable in this area. The districts have airfields. It has radio stations in various locations such as private issuers AM Z.P. 28 Radio the Voice of the Cordillera, three FM stations, Radio Sol, Radio Serrania and Radio Caacupé.

In Caacupé operate several institutions, such as the Governorate of the Cordillera, City Hall, Comptroller General of the Republic, Court of First Instance, Banco Nacional de Fomento, COPACO SA, ANDE, Mail, Regional Hospital, oversight of primary and secondary schools, National University Three private universities, secondary schools, primary and secondary schools, several high schools, private institutes, Paraguayan Red Cross, Lions Club, and several more institutions.

Economy 

The department Cordillera is primarily agricultural. It produces cotton, pineapple (pineapple), rice, sour orange, corn, sugarcane, banana, coffee, pepper, and strawberry, tangerine, peas, lemon and kaa he`e. There is also a producer of tomato, carrot, grapefruit, lemon, peanuts and manioc.

It also stresses the poultry production nationally and on a smaller scale, are breeding cattle, pigs, sheep, horses and goats.

Education 

The department has institutions providing education to students from the initial level, school education and basic education Media.

Tourism 
Lake Ypacaraí attracts tourists to the city of San Bernardino, the main centre of the country in summer. In Caacupé and Piribebuy are the streams of Ytú and Yhaguy Guazú, Amambay, Piraretá and Siete Caídas.

Other attractions include the Museum Hassler in San Bernardino, the site where the battle was fought in Acosta Ñu in Eusebio Ayala; the Basilica and the churches of Caacupé, Altos, Piribebuy, Valenzuela and Atyrá that still retains its original Franciscan altarpiece.

The chain of hills of Altos presents ideal places to climb, the hill Caacupé, the Cristo Rey (Ecological Reserve declared educational) and the hill Cavajhu and Atyrá.

In Tobatí, the hill Tobatí is a geological formation dating from 400 to 500 million years ago. It has strange ways of rocks that have received names like Leon semi dormido (lion that almost asleep), Yvytu Silla, Gigantesco Batracio and others.
It also can be accessed at Caraguatay, the place called Vapor Cué, site where the boats were abandoned by Paraguayans to avoid falling into the hands of the enemy during the Paraguayan War.

The area produces a variety of handicraft products such as encaje ju (embroidery made by hand), ponchos sesenta listas (typical cloth worn in winter), embossing leather, wood and other work.

References 

 Illustrated Geography of Paraguay. Arami. 2007

External links 

 Cordillera
 ABCcolor

 
States and territories established in 1906
1906 establishments in Paraguay